Hope Chest: The Fredonia Recordings 1982–1983, also known as just Hope Chest, is a compilation album of songs by American alternative rock band 10,000 Maniacs, released in 1990 by Elektra Records. It compiles tracks from their early releases Human Conflict Number Five (1982) and Secrets of the I Ching (1983). All tracks on the album are remixed from their original versions.

The original version of "Tension" from Human Conflict Number Five is not included on this compilation; only the re-recorded version of the song that was included on Secrets of the I Ching. Other than that, all of the songs from both releases are included on this disc—even "National Education Week", which had been dropped from later pressings of Secrets of the I Ching.

Two tracks on the album—"The Latin One" and "Anthem for Doomed Youth"—contain lyrics adapted from the works of British World War I poet Wilfred Owen, the latter being unique in the band's canon, as it features a lead vocal from guitarist John Lombardo.

Track listing

Personnel
10,000 Maniacs
John Lombardo – rhythm guitar, bass guitar (7, 12, 14); lead vocals on "Anthem for Doomed Youth"
Steven Gustafson – bass guitar (1–6, 8–11, 13), rhythm guitar (7, 12, 14)
Jerome Augustyniak – drums (tracks 2–7, 9, 11, 13–14)
Natalie Merchant – voice; background vocals on "Anthem for Doomed Youth"
Dennis Drew – organ
Robert Buck – lead guitar

Additional musicians
Jim Foti – drums (tracks 1, 8, 10, 12)

Technical
10,000 Maniacs – co-producers (tracks 1–14)
Bill Waldman – co-producer, engineer (tracks 1, 8, 10, 12)
Mary Van Houten – engineer (tracks 1, 8, 10, 12)
Gina Tampio – engineer (tracks 1, 8, 10, 12)
Albert Garzon – co-producer, engineer (tracks 2–7, 9, 11, 13–14)
Joe Barbaria – remixing
Greg Calbi – mastering
Ann States – Maniac photos
Frank Olinsky (Manhattan Design) – packaging
Natalie Merchant – packaging
Grace Galloway – liner notes

References

10,000 Maniacs compilation albums
1990 compilation albums
Elektra Records compilation albums